Stanley H. Durwood Soccer Stadium and Recreational Field, commonly known as Durwood Soccer Stadium or DSSRF for short, is a soccer-specific stadium on the University of Missouri–Kansas City (UMKC) campus that serves as the home of the Kansas City Roos men's and women's soccer teams. It was the home of the National Women's Soccer League's FC Kansas City during the 2014 season. The stadium has a capacity of 850 seats and has a running track around the field.

The stadium opened in 2009, with an official dedication ceremony before a Kangaroos match on October 6, 2009. It is named after Stanley H. Durwood, a longtime benefactor of the university's athletic department, and his foundation contributed $5 million of the $9 million it cost to build the stadium.

UMKC and FC Kansas City reached a two-year deal in January 2014 to play the team's home matches at DSSRF and to expand the seating capacity to 3,200, but after one season, the team moved to Swope Soccer Village.

The stadium also hosted a 2010 U.S. Open Cup match between the Kansas City Wizards (now Sporting Kansas City) and the Colorado Rapids.

References

External links
 Stanley H. Durwood Soccer Stadium and Recreational Field

Sports venues in Kansas City, Missouri
Kansas City Roos
FC Kansas City
Soccer venues in Missouri
Former National Women's Soccer League stadiums
College soccer venues in the United States
Sports venues completed in 2009
2009 establishments in Missouri
Sports venues in Missouri